South Africa is a deeply unequal society, with mass unemployment and homelessness. One response to this on the part of social movements of the poor has been the occupation of land. This article lists land occupations in South Africa.

2001
Bredell land occupation

2009
Macassar Village land occupation

2011
Mitchell's Plain land occupation

2013
Marikana land occupation (Cape Town)
Marikana land occupation (Durban)

See also
Anti-Land Invasion Unit (Cape Town)
Abahlali baseMjondolo
Western Cape Anti-Eviction Campaign

South Africa-related lists